Abu Dardah is a Syrian village located in Hama Nahiyah in Hama District in Hama.  According to the Syria Central Bureau of Statistics (CBS), Abu Dardah had a population of 486 in the 2004 census.

References 

Populated places in Hama District